Palgrave Academy was an early dissenting academy, that is, a school or college set up by English Dissenters. It was run from 1774 to 1785 in Palgrave, Suffolk, by the married couple Anna Laetitia Barbauld and her husband Rochemont Barbauld, a minister. The academy attracted parents who wished an alternative to traditional education for their sons.

Beginnings
Anna Laetitia Barbauld was born into the tradition of the so-called dissenting academies, as her father John Aikin taught first at Kibworth Academy, where she received a better education than most girls and women of the day, and then at the renowned Warrington Academy, known as "the Athens of the North" for its stimulating intellectual atmosphere. Rochemont Barbauld, the grandson of a Huguenot (French Dissenter), had been a pupil there; the couple married in 1774 and moved to Suffolk, near where Rochemont had been offered a congregation and this school for boys.

The couple spent eleven years teaching at Palgrave Academy. Early on, Anna Laetitia Barbauld was not only responsible for running her own household but also the school's—she was accountant, maid, and housekeeper.

The school opened with only eight boys, but when the Barbaulds left in 1785, around forty were enrolled, a testament to the excellent reputation the school had acquired. The Barbaulds' educational philosophy attracted Anglicans as well as Dissenters. Palgrave replaced the strict discipline of traditional schools such as Eton, which often used corporal punishment, with a system of "fines and jobations" and even, it seems likely, "juvenile trials", that is trials run by and for the pupils themselves. Moreover, instead of the traditional classical studies, the school offered a practical curriculum that stressed science and the modern languages. Mrs Barbauld taught the foundation subjects of reading and religion to the youngest boys and geography, history, composition, rhetoric, and science to the older boys. She also produced a "weekly chronicle" for the school and wrote theatrical pieces for the pupils to perform.

Alumni
Pupils who later distinguished themselves include Lord Chief Justice Thomas Denman, 1st Baron Denman, scholar and translator William Taylor, settler of early Canada Thomas Douglas, 5th Earl of Selkirk, and archaeologist Sir William Gell. Barbauld had a profound effect on many of her students; Taylor, a preeminent scholar of German literature, referred to her as "the mother of my mind".

References

Anna Laetitia Barbauld
Defunct schools in Suffolk
Dissenting academies
Educational institutions established in 1774
1774 establishments in England
1785 disestablishments in England
Educational institutions disestablished in the 1780s